This is a list of electoral results for the electoral district of Manly in Queensland state elections.

Members for Manly

Election results

Elections in the 1980s

References

Queensland state electoral results by district